Pinhead Gunpowder is the fifth EP by the American punk rock band Pinhead Gunpowder. It was released on June 6, 2000 through THD Records. The EP features the same cover as the band's second compilation album Compulsive Disclosure (2003), all of the songs on the EP also feature on that album.

Track listing
All songs written by Aaron Cometbus, except where noted.

Side A
"Buffalo" - 1:51
"Crazyhorse" - 1:44

Side B
"New Blood" (Wilhelm Fink) - 1:32
"Letter from an Old Friend" - 1:21

References

Pinhead Gunpowder albums
2000 EPs